Vasily Fedorovich Novitsky (- 15 January 1929) was a Russian general with a liberal, progressive viewpoint during the 19th century of Imperial Russia.  During the Russian Revolution, in 1917, he sided with the Bolsheviks.

Service

While Captain, in 1888, he spent four months as a guest of the Indian Army.  His Indian studies were released in 1899, in a semi-classified document, Military Sketches of India, which he was held in high regard for, especially since he had detailed the dangerous Leh-Yarkand-Kashgar route.

He is most famously known for his liberal handling of the 1899 Russian student strike, as he was called in to handle protesting students as a military officer.  He was the head of the Kiev Gendarme.  But when he arrived, he saw that the student demonstrations were peaceful, and "he brought in the dean, who was immediately offered an armchair by the side of the chairman [of the student demonstrators]."  The student chairman said to the rector, "We wanted to meet with you, but you wouldn't have it!  So you have been fetched here by the gendarmes!"

But in 1902, as the head of the Kiev gendarme, he became more menacing towards revolutionary elements.  He systematically interrogated members of the group Iskra, who were emigre Socialist Revolutionaries, and for whom he was planning a great, state trial, hoping that he could get a heavy sentence passed against the revolutionaries.

During World War I, Novitsky was part of the Northern Front, responsible for fighting the Central Powers from Riga in the north down to northern Belarus.

Soviet Union

When the Russian Revolution destroyed Imperial Russia, Novitsky came to accept the new social and political change.  In Soviet history, he is credited by historians with having made "a notable contribution to the rise and evolution of Soviet military art."

Works

 Military Sketches of India (1899)
 Cossacks, Cossack groups, Cossack military forces (1915)

References

Imperial Russian Army generals
Soviet generals
1869 births
1929 deaths

Recipients of the Gold Sword for Bravery
Recipients of the Order of St. Vladimir, 2nd class
Recipients of the Order of St. Vladimir, 3rd class
Recipients of the Order of St. Vladimir, 4th class
Recipients of the Order of St. Anna, 2nd class
Recipients of the Order of St. Anna, 3rd class
Recipients of the Order of Saint Stanislaus (Russian), 2nd class
Recipients of the Order of Saint Stanislaus (Russian), 3rd class
Russian military personnel of the Russo-Japanese War
Burials at Novodevichy Cemetery
Explorers from the Russian Empire